The .375 Weatherby Magnum (9.5×73mmB) is a medium-bore rifle cartridge. The cartridge is blown out, improved and provided with the Weatherby double radius shoulder – given the Weatherby treatment – version of the .375 H&H Magnum. Unlike other improved versions of the .375 H&H Magnum like the .375 Ackley Improved, the .375 Weatherby Magnum is not a wildcat and existed as a proprietary cartridge until the CIP published specifications for the cartridge.

History 
The .375 Weatherby Magnum was designed by Roy Weatherby in South Gate, California, in 1944 and put into production in 1945. The original cases were fire formed from .300 H&H Magnum Winchester brass, then from Richard Speer’s 300 Weatherby brass before finally settling with Norma as a source for cases. It was also with Norma that Weatherby finally found a source for loaded ammunition. Production of .375 Weatherby ammunition ceased in 1960 but was reintroduced in 2001 due to demand.

Comments 
The .375 Weatherby was designed as a dangerous game cartridge. This performance level makes it an appropriate all-round African safari cartridge that is usable against plains game species as well. The .375 Weatherby is considered overly powerful for North American game.

As the .375 Weatherby is an improved cartridge, .375 H&H Magnum ammunition can be fired in .375 Weatherby chambers with a slight loss in performance of the .375 H&H ammunition. Cases thus fired are in essence fire formed to the Weatherby cartridge's dimensions and if reloaded should be reloaded using .375 Weatherby reloading data. Reloading data is available from A-Square, Barnes and Hornady.

Ammunition is available from Weatherby (Norma), A-Square and Connelly Precision. Rifles are available from Weatherby and A-Square. Most .375 H&H rifles can be converted to the .375 Weatherby Magnum by having the new chamber reamed with no further modifications made to the rifle. The cartridge also makes an excellent choice for those who want a step up in performance over the .375 H&H Magnum without the recoil or cost of the .378 Weatherby Magnum.

Design and specifications
The .375 Weatherby Magnum is an improved version of the .375 H&H Magnum. The cartridge features the Weatherby double radius shoulder. The Weatherby Magnum is not considered a proprietary cartridge as the CIP has published specifications for the cartridge.

Case capacity is 105 gr. of water (6.82 cm3). The FreeBore/Leade for this Cartridge is 0.373 thou. as per the Factory Spec's.

Performance
As an improved cartridge the .375 Weatherby Magnum provides a leap in performance over its parent cartridge. The cartridge generates more energy than factory loads for the .375 Remington Ultra Magnum, .416 Rigby or the .458 Winchester Magnum.

See also
List of cartridges by caliber
List of rifle cartridges
9mm caliber

References

Sources
Barnes, Frank C., ed. by John T. Amber. Cartridges of the World. Northfield, IL: DBI Books, 1972.
Hornady Handbook of Cartridge Reloading, 7th edition, 2007.

Pistol and rifle cartridges
Magnum rifle cartridges
Weatherby Magnum rifle cartridges